Provincial research organizations (PROs) are Canadian provincial government initiatives to promote research and development and adoption of technology in their respective provinces. The first PRO in Canada was the Alberta Research Council. Statistics Canada reports on the activities of PROs.

PROs focus on applied research and technical services and generally specialize in industry sectors that are native to their provinces. Because they play an important role in growing and sustaining industry, they are considered a key component of provincial economic development strategies. PROs are also consulted by government for innovation and economic development policy input. PROs are sustained through the combination of provincial grants and fees for services.

PROs have been established in Canada as follows:

 Alberta Research Council (1921)
 Ontario Research Foundation (1928)
 British Columbia Research Council (1944) and now the BC Innovation Council
 Nova Scotia Research Foundation (1946)
 Saskatchewan Research Council (1947)
 New Brunswick Research and Productivity Council] (1962)
 Manitoba Research Council (1963), now Industrial Technology Center (ITC)
 Centre de Recherche Industrielle du Québec (1969)

In 2009 Newfoundland and Labrador formed the Newfoundland and Labrador Research and Development Council.

References

External links
Alberta Research Council 
BC Innovation Council
Saskatchewan Research Council 
New Brunswick Research and Productivity Council 
Industrial Technology Center 
Centre de Researche Industrielle du Quebec 
Newfoundland and Labrador Research and Development Council.

Canadian provincial departments and agencies
Research organizations